Bolton Street Memorial Park, formerly known as Bolton Street Cemetery, is the oldest cemetery in Wellington, New Zealand. Dating back to 1840, many notable people are buried here. Situated in the suburb of Thorndon, the Wellington City Council's memorial trail number five covers the Bolton Street Memorial Park and visits notable graves, points of interest, lookouts and buildings.

History
The park's history could probably be the history of those buried there; old pioneers are buried in the Victorian-type cemetery. Established as a cemetery in 1840 on the outskirts of the new town of Wellington, separate burial areas were designated for Anglicans, Jews and Roman Catholics. Many notable people of the town were buried there, including William Wakefield, Wellington's founder. It was closed for burials in 1892, except for the new burials of kins; this was due to inadequate space as the city grew.

In 1960, the City Council's urban plan established a need for a motorway, a part of which would be routed through the cemetery. Seven years later, the City Council passed an act to build a motorway through the park. As a result, the cemetery was closed as a burial ground from March 1967 through 1971. The historic cemetery, bisected by the Wellington Urban Motorway, caused extensive controversy at the time. The new motorway opened in 1978, and in the same year, the Wellington City Council Parks renamed the cemetery as the Bolton Street Memorial Park.  Though the Friends of Bolton Street protested against the shifting of the graves, they did not stop construction of the road but ensured that the cemetery got a heritage status and the park got a reserve nomenclature. In spite of protests, about 3,700 graves were exhumed and relocated, most of whom were re-interred in a large vault beneath the park's lawn.
The relocated parts of the cemetery with head stones are linked through a foot bridge over the road. Of the 8,500 people reported buried in the park, only 1334 headstones (made of marble or local stones) were traced and 35 are made in wood.

Historian Margaret Alington was commissioned to write a history of the cemetery. Her book, Unquiet Earth: a History of the Bolton Street Cemetery, was published in 1978.

Grounds
Some of the initial land was surrendered for the Bowen Street cutting and to Anderson Park.

The approach to the park is from Bolton Street, from a signed pathway off Bowen Street and from Botanic Garden, immediately after Anderson Park. There are walkways in the park on either side of the motorway, which have several signs giving Wellington's colonial history. The trail is popular among joggers; the Upper Trail is steep compared to the Lower Trail which in places have steps. Tutaenui creek is located in a gulley within the park. Bolton Street Memorial Park is now a historic reserve under the jurisdiction of the Parks and Recreation Department of the Wellington City Council.

Architecture

Of the initial three buildings constructed in the cemetery area, only one remains. The Church of England's Sexton's Cottage, a historic building built out of timber in 1857, was enlarged in 1885 and is now being restored. The public cemetery's Sexton's Cottage, also constructed of timber in 1857, was occupied by the sexton David Robertson and his family before the building was demolished in 1908; only its brick outlines are still viewable in the upper lawn. The Mortuary Chapel, built of timber in 1866, was left to deteriorate without any repairs and was finally demolished in 1969 to make way for the motorway. Based on recorded drawings of it, a replica chapel was built and serves as the visitor centre. Situated in the smaller half of the cemetery, it contains exhibits on the park's history, details of those buried at the cemetery, along with printed lists of names. A beehive centre is maintained by the Friends of Bolton Street Memorial Park who also facilitate information on conservation of the park's beehives.

Flora
The park also serves as an extension of Wellington Botanic Garden with areas of open lawns, undulating topography covered by a mix of regenerating native scrub and plantings of exotic trees, shrubs, perennials and bulbs. Notable is the heritage roses collection among the graves.

The park's heritage rose collection is of national significance. When land was allotted on the hillside in 1840 for the public cemetery (non-sectarian), the original settlers planted roses. These were later supplemented by the Wellington Botanic Garden in association with Heritage Roses New Zealand Inc. Under the Wellington City Council Management Plan, the rose garden is maintained by the Wellington Botanic Garden.

The "memorial roses" reported from the park are: Rosa banksiae 'Lutea', Rosa banksiae alba plena, Rosa indica major, 'Félicité et Perpétue, 'Climbing Cécile Brünner', and 'Souvenir de la Malmaison', which were planted by people visiting the graves, gifts of plants by the public, members of the Wellington Heritage Rose Society, and also from Europe under the seed exchange programme. According to the recorded list, the park now has 210 heritage roses of which important cultivars and species include 'Archduke Joseph', 'Mutabilis', 'Kazanlik', 'Old Blush China', 'Viridiflora', 'La France', 'Honorine de Brabant', 'Ispahan', 'Roseraire de l'Haÿ', 'Alberic Barbier', R. eglanteria, 'Tuscany', 'Souvenir de Madame Léonie Viennot', 'Cornelia', Rosa moyesii 'Fargesii', 'Blushing Lucy', 'Madame Plantier', Rosa laevigata, Rosa altaica, Rosa bracteata, and 'Joseph Cartier'.

Burials

Graves still existing:
 William Beetham (1809–1888), esteemed portrait painter and founder of New Zealand Academy of Fine Arts in 1882.
 Henry Blundell (1813–1878), newspaper proprietor and founder of The Evening Post
 James FitzGerald (circa 1818 – 1896), prominent 19th century politician
 Harry Holland (1868–1933), leader of the New Zealand Labour Party
 Kennedy Macdonald (1847–1914), 19th century Liberal Party Member of Parliament; the Macdonald grave is also notable for its angel statue in commemoration of their three sons lost within one month in 1876 to scarlet fever
 Samuel Duncan Parnell (1810–1890), credited with the establishment of the Eight-hour day in New Zealand
 John Plimmer (1812–1905), entrepreneur who is sometimes called "the Father of Wellington"
 William Barnard Rhodes (1807?–1878), businessman, pastoralist and politician; at his death, one of the richest people in New Zealand
 Richard Seddon (1845–1906), longest-serving Prime Minister of New Zealand (from 1893 to 1906) was the first to grant voting rights to women and institute old pension to citizens
 Christian Toxward (1831–1891), Wellington architect
 brothers Edward Gibbon Wakefield (1796–1862) and William Wakefield (1801– 1848), both closely involved with the colonisation of New Zealand
 Jonas Woodward (1810?–1881), businessman, educationalist, politician, congregational leader and public trustee

Reinstated monument after disinterment for motorway
 Alexander Turnbull (1868–1918), New Zealand merchant, dandy and book collector

Graves moved for motorway construction:
 Alfred Ludlam (1810–1877), leading New Zealand politician, horticulturist, farmer, philanthropist, and a founder of Wellington's Botanic Garden
 George Macfarlan (1837/38–1868), Member of Parliament representing the  electorate

Notes

References

External links
 Wellington cemeteries search
 

Cemeteries in Wellington City
Tourist attractions in Wellington City
Parks in Wellington City